Albert was an electoral district of the House of Assembly in South Australia, spanning its time as both a colony and a state. It was created in 1875, taking much territory from adjacent Victoria, merged with Victoria in 1902 as Victoria and Albert, separated again in 1915, and abolished in 1970.

In 1875, Albert had booths at Bordertown, Kingston, Meningie, Naracoorte, Robe and Wellington East. It added booths at Lucindale (1878), Mannum East (1884), Wolseley (1885) and Mundulla (1887). It lost the Mannum East booth in 1890, but added further booths at Frances, Glenroy and Keith in 1893, at which time the Naracoorte booth was also renamed Kincraig. In 1896, Albert also added booths at Conmurra, Holder, Kingston on Murray, Lyrup, Murtho, Point McLeay, Pyap and Waikerie, but lost Glenroy. It regained a Glenroy booth and added Cookes Plains in 1899. It was then merged with Victoria as Victoria and Albert from the 1902 state election.

The recreated Albert seat in 1915 had booths at Alawoona, Berri, Bogg Flat, Borrika, Chapman Bore, Cookes Plains, Coomandook, Clarfield, Coonalpyn, East Wellington, Geranium, Glenope, Hooper, Karoonda, Lameroo, Loxton, Lyrup, Marmon Jabuk, Meningie, Moorlands, Netherton, Notts Well, Paisley, Pangira, Parilla, Parrakie, Paruna, Peake, Point McLeay, Poyntz Bore, Pinnaroo, Pyap West, Sandalwood, Sherlock, Swan Reach, Tailem Bend, Taplan, Tintinara, Waikerie, Wanbi, West Wellington and Wilkawatt.

In 1938, the House of Assembly changed from multi-member to single-member districts, and Albert was redistributed as a smaller district along significantly district boundaries, losing territory along the Murray River to the new seats of Chaffey and Ridley and the redistributed Murray. The new Albert had booths at Ashville, Bordertown, Buccleuch, Cannawigara, Clanfield, Cookes Plains, Coomandook, Coonalpyn, Cotton, Custon, Geranium, Gurrai, Jabuk, Karte, Ki Ki, Kulkami, Keith, Kongal, Lameroo, Meningie, Moorlands, Mulpata North, Mundalla, Narrung, Netherton, Padthaway, Parilla, Parrakie, Peake, Peebinga, Pinnaroo, Point McLeay, Sherlock, Tintinara, Wilkawatt, Wirrega and Wolseley.

Members

Election results

References 

Former electoral districts of South Australia
1875 establishments in Australia
1915 establishments in Australia
1902 disestablishments in Australia
1959 disestablishments in Australia
Constituencies established in 1875
Constituencies disestablished in 1959
Constituencies established in 1915
Constituencies disestablished in 1902